Gunnar Aleksander Korhonen (22 April 1918 – 9 June 2001) was a Finnish politician and the CEO of Finnair from 1960–1987.

Career
Korhonen had a degree in economics and worked as a civil servant. He became the CEO of Finnair in 1960. He was the Minister of Social Affairs and Health briefly in 1970 during Aura's caretaker government. During Aura's second caretaker government from 1971–1972 he was both Minister of Trade and Industry and Deputy Minister of Health and Social Affairs.

In popular culture
He was played by Taisto Oksanen in the Finnish docudrama Keihäsmatkat.

See also
 List of Cabinet Ministers from Finland by ministerial portfolio

References

1918 births
2001 deaths
Ministers of Trade and Industry of Finland
Ministers of Social Affairs of Finland
Finnish diplomats
Finnair
Politicians from Vyborg